Love and Curses is a 1938 Warner Bros. Merrie Melodies cartoon directed by Ben Hardaway and Cal Dalton. The short was released on July 9, 1938.

Synopsis 
An old hero couple, Harold and Emily, are looking through a photo album and remember a picnic they had in the 1890s that was interrupted by villain Roger St. Clair, who tries to tempt Emily into leaving Harold and going to the city. When that does not work, he takes her by force. Harold is still searching for her six months later.
Meanwhile, Emily is forced to sing on the stage of Roger's bar with a barbershop quartet. Harold passes by and notices this. Roger traps Harold with a stage prop, and ties Emily to the railroad tracks. Harold rescues her, but the St. Clair snatches the tied up Emily and carries her to a sawmill.  
Harold calls for his lover as he entered the mill, but Roger uses a log swing and knocks Harold unconsciously into the conveyor belt that leads to a giant circular saw blade.  As St. Clair pulled the lever that could send his opponent to his doom, Harold's hard head, however, not only destroyed the sawblade, but in the aftermath, multiple saw tools took its place. Frustrated, Roger pulled out a revolver to gun down Harold, but the hero repelled the bullets until the St. Clair ran out of ammunition. The villain uses a nearby lumber board to outwit Harold, but the hero grabs the board with the St. Clair and throws them out bodily, but both the villain and the board flew back at Harold.  The brawl continues until Harold defeats Roger, sending the fallen foe into the river, never to be seen again.  
After the old couple finished looking at the album, Harold wonders whatever happened to Roger St. Clair, who then returns.  He declares that a St. Clair never gives up and drags Emily away once again. Harold tries to be heroic, but sings the chorus of Poor Old Joe as he leaves the room to rescue his wife.

Voice cast 
 Mel Blanc as Harold, Roger St. Clair, Sailor, Man at Peep Show
 Mildred Carroll as Emily
 Bill Days, Max Smith, John Rarig, Thurl Ravenscroft and Paul Taylor as Singing Bartenders

References

External links
 

1938 films
1938 animated films
Merrie Melodies short films
Warner Bros. Cartoons animated short films
1938 short films
Films directed by Ben Hardaway
Films directed by Cal Dalton
Films set in the 1890s
Films scored by Carl Stalling
1930s Warner Bros. animated short films
1930s English-language films